Gong Xiaobin (born November 23, 1969 in Jinan, Shandong), is a retired Chinese professional basketball player, who enjoyed an outstanding career in the Chinese Basketball Association (CBA). At 2.03 m (6'8"), and 104 kg (230 lbs.), he played at the power forward and center positions. In 1990, he was chosen as one of China's 50 all-time greatest basketball players.

Early life 
In 1982, Gong began to play for the Shandong Province youth soccer team, and in 1986, at the age of 17, he was selected to the Chinese national Under-19 team. In 1988, Gong competed in a national urban basketball tournament, and was chosen as an outstanding player; he was also listed as one of China's top ten basketball players of that year; in 1989, at the age of 20, Gong joined the Chinese national basketball team.

Professional career
In the Chinese Basketball Association (CBA), Gong played at the center position for the Shandong Lions, and in the 1997–98 season, he won the league's scoring title and regular season MVP award. He was named to the list of the 50 greatest Chinese basketball players of the second half of the 20th century.

As a basketball player, Gong Xiao Bin represented his native Shandong Province, both as a sports role model, and as a player, leading the Shandong men's team at the Chinese National Games, including the 1997 games in Shanghai, at which the Shandong Province finished 3rd overall.

Chinese national team
As a member of the senior men's Chinese national basketball team, Gong competed for China in the 1989 Asian Games, the 1994 FIBA World Championship, and in the 1996 Summer Olympics. In 2002, at the age of 33, he was still playing internationally, representing China in the Asian games and the FIBA World Championship.

Coaching career
Gong retired from his career as a basketball player in 2003, and he began a new career coaching basketball, for the CBA's Shandong Lions.

See also
List of individual Chinese Basketball Association scoring leaders by season

References
This article originally translated from :zh:巩晓彬

External links
 Gong Xiao Bin at sina.com
 刚退役就挂帅　巩晓彬事出无奈 An article about Gong's retirement

1969 births
Living people
Centers (basketball)
Power forwards (basketball)
Sportspeople from Jinan
Shandong Hi-Speed Kirin players
Basketball players from Shandong
Chinese men's basketball players
1990 FIBA World Championship players
Olympic basketball players of China
Basketball players at the 1992 Summer Olympics
Basketball players at the 1996 Summer Olympics
Asian Games medalists in basketball
Asian Games gold medalists for China
Asian Games silver medalists for China
Basketball players at the 1990 Asian Games
Basketball players at the 1994 Asian Games
Basketball players at the 1998 Asian Games
Basketball players at the 2002 Asian Games
Medalists at the 1990 Asian Games
Medalists at the 1994 Asian Games
Medalists at the 1998 Asian Games
Medalists at the 2002 Asian Games
2002 FIBA World Championship players
1994 FIBA World Championship players